Entry of the Theotokos into the Temple Church may refer to several Orthodox churches:

Romania
Entry of the Theotokos into the Temple Church, Bistrița
Entry of the Theotokos into the Temple Church, Focșani
Ovidenia Armeni Church, Focșani
Entry of the Theotokos into the Temple Church, Iași
Entry of the Theotokos into the Temple Church, Sighișoara